Actinodaphne ellipticbacca is a species of plant in the family Lauraceae. It is endemic to Vietnam.

References

ellipticbacca
Endemic flora of Vietnam
Trees of Vietnam
Vulnerable plants
Taxonomy articles created by Polbot
Taxobox binomials not recognized by IUCN